The Order of Pharmacists of Lebanon is a pharmaceutical organisation based in Beirut.

It formed a partnership with the Royal Pharmaceutical Society in February 2018.

More than 1,800 pharmacists attended its 24th Annual Congress in 2016.

It is supported by Michel Aoun the President of Lebanon.

References

Pharmacy organizations
Medical and health organisations based in Lebanon